Jefferson Township is one of the twenty-five townships of Muskingum County, Ohio, United States.  The 2000 census found 1,766 people in the township, 416 of whom lived in the unincorporated portions of the township.

Geography
Located in the northern part of the county, it borders the following townships:
Madison Township - east
Cass Township - west

Most of the village of Dresden is located in northern Jefferson Township.

Name and history
It is one of twenty-four Jefferson Townships statewide.

Jefferson Township was described in 1833 as having one church, two flouring mills, three saw mills, and six physicians.

Government
The township is governed by a three-member board of trustees, who are elected in November of odd-numbered years to a four-year term beginning on the following January 1. Two are elected in the year after the presidential election and one is elected in the year before it. There is also an elected township fiscal officer, who serves a four-year term beginning on April 1 of the year after the election, which is held in November of the year before the presidential election. Vacancies in the fiscal officership or on the board of trustees are filled by the remaining trustees.

References

External links

Townships in Muskingum County, Ohio
Townships in Ohio